Friary Park is a nine hectare formal Edwardian park in Friern Barnet in the London Borough of Barnet.

History
The site was home to the Knights Hospitaller in the Middle Ages, and of Friern Barnet Manor House from the sixteenth century. The name Friary Park was adopted in the 1870s and it was opened to the public in 1910. In 2010 the Friends of Friary Park and other local societies organised centenary celebrations.

Facilities
It is owned and managed by Barnet Council, and has a children's playground, tennis courts, a bowling green, a pitch and putt, a skatepark, outdoor gym equipment and a cafe. It is a Site of Local Importance for Nature Conservation, and has received a Green Flag Award.

The cafe is housed in the nineteenth century Gothic Revival Friary House, which is otherwise mostly unused, although Barnet Council announced in 2010 that work is underway to convert it to a base for the local police Safer Neighbourhood Team.

A prominent feature is a statue, the 'Bringer of Peace', erected by Sydney Simmons and dedicated to the memory of King Edward VII, and erected on 7 May 1910, the day after his death.

Its most interesting features ecologically are ancient oak trees and a small stream called Blacketts Brook, a tributary of Pymme's Brook.

There is access from Torrington Park, Friary Road and Friern Barnet Lane.

The park has an active friends group.

North Middlesex Golf Course ponds
The North Middlesex Golf Course is adjacent to the park to the north at Grid Ref . Blacketts Brook runs through two ponds on the golf course before entering the park. Palmate newts, which are rare in London, breed in the ponds, which are a Site of Borough Importance for Nature Conservation, Grade II. The reserve is not open to the public.

Gallery

See also

 Barnet parks and open spaces
 Nature reserves in Barnet

Notes

External links
 Friary Park, London Gardens Online

Nature reserves in the London Borough of Barnet
Parks and open spaces in the London Borough of Barnet
Friern Barnet